TSPO can refer to:

 Tokyo Ska Paradise Orchestra
 Translocator protein